Volochayevka may refer to the following places in Russia:

Volochayevka-1
Volochayevka-2